Chalana Chameera is a Sri Lankan professional footballer who plays as a midfielder.

References

External links
 Chalana Chameera on ESPN

Sri Lankan footballers
Living people
Sri Lanka international footballers
Sri Lanka Navy SC (football) players
1993 births
Association football midfielders
Sri Lanka Football Premier League players